Ruscus is a genus of six species of flowering plants, native to western and southern Europe, Macaronesia, northwestern Africa, and southwestern Asia east to the Caucasus. In the APG III classification system, it is placed in the family Asparagaceae, subfamily Nolinoideae (formerly the family Ruscaceae). Like many lilioid monocots, it was formerly classified in the family Liliaceae.

The true leaves are minute, scale-like, and non-photosynthetic. The flowers are small, white with a dark-violet centre, and situated on the middle of the cladodes. The fruit is a red berry  in diameter. Some species are monoecious while others are dioecious.

Ruscus is spread by seed and by means of underground rhizomes. It can colonise extensive patches of ground.

Species
Ruscus aculeatus (butcher's broom). Europe, Azores.
Ruscus colchicus Caucasus.
Ruscus hypoglossum Central and Southeast Europe, Turkey.
Ruscus hypophyllum (spineless butcher's broom). Iberia, northwest Africa. Used in the floral trade as foliage.
Ruscus hyrcanus Woronow An endemic and relict bush in the Talish Mountains,  Azerbaijan. Protected in the Hirkan national Park.
Ruscus x microglossus Southern Europe.
Ruscus streptophyllus Madeira.

References

External links
Flora Europaea: Ruscus

Asparagaceae genera